The Aguadilla City Police Department (A.C.P.D.) are the local police force in the town of Aguadilla, Puerto Rico. It was created under law #19 of May 12, 1977, known as Ley de la Policia Municipal (Municipal Police Law) creating the local police forces in each city of Puerto Rico. The A.C.P.D. only have jurisdiction in the municipality of Aguadilla and provide service and protection to local citizens and travelers alike in collaboration with the Puerto Rico Police Department, who have full jurisdiction.

The majority of the force is bilingual and can communicate with foreigners. Although limited to its jurisdiction, the A.C.P.D. works in collaboration with other local, state, and federal agencies including Border Patrol, the Emergency Management Office, State Police, Fire Department, FEMA, D.E.A., F.B.I., and A.T.F. The A.C.P.D is directed by a Commissioner appointed by the Mayor of Aguadilla and consists of Lieutenants, Sergeants, Police Officers, Cadets and civilian personnel that handle secretarial and maintenance duties. There are several divisions in the A.C.P.D., including the "Transit Division", which covers all the major highways; the "Tactical Division" that carries out special operations such as acting on search warrants and arrest warrants; the "Marine Division", which patrols the local beaches and up to nine nautical miles off the coast of Aguadilla with jet-skis, patrol boats, and ATVS to prevent the introduction of narcotics and illegal immigrants; the "Motorcycle Division", which covers all other areas together with patrol cars; the "Bicycle Division", who are assigned near the main Plaza; and the "Community Service Division", which works to develop a better relationship between the police and community by coordinating projects and activities.

Photo gallery

References

External links
 

1981 establishments in Puerto Rico
Aguadilla, Puerto Rico
Municipal police departments of Puerto Rico